The Archives Italiennes de Biologie: A Journal of Neuroscience is a  quarterly peer-reviewed open access scientific journal. The journal was established in 1882; publication was suspended between 1936 and 1957. It originally covered all aspects of biology, especially physiology, but now focusses on neuroscience.

Editors-in-chief
The following persons have been editors-in-chief of the journal:

Abstracting and indexing
The journal is abstracted and indexed in the Science Citation Index, Current Contents/Life Sciences, BIOSIS Previews, Chemical Abstracts Service, and Index Medicus/MEDLINE/PubMed. According to the Journal Citation Reports, the journal has a 2013 impact factor of 1.422.

References

External links
 

Neuroscience journals
Quarterly journals
English-language journals
Publications established in 1882
University of Pisa